The Man Without Nerves (German: Der Mann ohne Nerven) is a 1924 German silent crime film directed by Harry Piel, assisted by Gérard Bourgeois and starring Piel, Dary Holm and Albert Paulig. It was shot at the EFA Studios in Berlin. It premiered in Berlin on 5 December 1924.

Cast
 Harry Piel as Der Mann ohne Nerven 
 Dary Holm as Aud Egede Christensen 
 Albert Paulig as Henry Ricold 
 Marguerite Madys as Yvette 
 Paul Guidé as Hector Marcel 
 Denise Legeay as Lizzie 
 José Davert as Jack Brown 
 Hermann Picha as Der Notar des Herzogs

References

Bibliography
 Grange, William. Cultural Chronicle of the Weimar Republic. Scarecrow Press, 2008.

External links

1924 films
Films of the Weimar Republic
German silent feature films
German crime films
1924 crime films
Films directed by Harry Piel
German black-and-white films
Bavaria Film films
1920s German films
Films shot at Halensee Studios
1920s German-language films